China competed in the 2009 East Asian Games which were held in Hong Kong, China from December 5, 2009 to December 13, 2009. China finished first with 113 gold medals.

Medalists

Dancesport

Gold

Fan Wenbo / Chen Shiyao  Dancesport Latin - Samba
Shen Hong / Liang Yujie  Dancesport Standard - Waltz
Shen Hong / Liang Yujie  Dancesport Standard - Tango
Fan Wenbo / Chen Shiyao  Dancesport Latin - Rumba
Lu Jie / Peng Ding  Dancesport Standard - Slow Foxtrot
Shi Lei / Zhang Baiyu Dancesport Latin - Paso Doble

Silver

Shi Lei / Zhang Baiyu Dancesport Latin - Jive
Lu Jie / Peng Ding  Dancesport Standard - Viennese Waltz

Basketball

Gold
China - Chen Xiaojia, Gao Song, Guan Xin, Huang Hongpin, Ji Xiao, Lu Wen, Shi Xiufeng, Wei Wei, Xu Ge, Yang Banban, Zhang Wei, Zhang Yu -Dec 11 2009 Basketball Women

See also
 China at the Asian Games
 China at the Olympics
 Sports in China

References
https://web.archive.org/web/20091209023409/http://results.2009eastasiangames.hk/en/Root.mvc/MedalCountry/CHN

2009 East Asian Games
2009
2009 in Chinese sport